The men's Coppa Italia is the water polo domestic Cup of Italy. The trophy is organized by FIN and reserved to Serie A1 teams. The first edition took place in 1970 and the most successful club is Pro Recco, winner of the competition for 16 times.

History and format
The first edition of the trophy was held in 1970 and was won by Canottieri Napoli. Later, Coppa Italia was held discontinuously except for a nine-years streak of back-to-back seasons between 1984–85 and 1992–93.

The trophy was resumed regularly starting from 2004–05 season. Since this last inception, the most successful team has been Pro Recco, which won the Cup for 13 times out of 15 editions. The trophy, as of the 2018–19 season, is contested by all the Serie A1 teams. The participants competes in one or two round-robin qualification stages and then face each other in a knock-out final round. In the most recent Olympic years (2016 and 2020), the Cup has been restricted to the teams ranked from 1st to 4th place in the first half of the Serie A1 regular season, due to the clubs' and National teams' overcrowded calendar.

Winners

1970:  Canottieri Napoli
1971–73: Not held
1974:  Pro Recco
1975: Not held
1976: RN Florentia
1977–83: Not held
1984–85: Pescara
1985–86: Pescara
1986–87: CN Posillipo
1987–88: RN Arenzano
1988–89: Pescara
1989–90: RN Savona
1990–91: RN Savona
1991–92: Pescara
1992–93: RN Savona
1994–97: Not held
1997–98: Pescara
1999–2004: Not held
2004–05: Canottieri Bissolati
2005–06:  Pro Recco
2006–07:  Pro Recco
2007–08:  Pro Recco
2008–09:  Pro Recco
2009–10:  Pro Recco
2010–11:  Pro Recco
2011–12: AN Brescia
2012–13:  Pro Recco
2013–14:  Pro Recco
2014–15:  Pro Recco
2015–16:  Pro Recco
2016–17:  Pro Recco
2017–18:  Pro Recco
2018–19:  Pro Recco
2019–20: not assigned due to the COVID-19 pandemic.
2020–21:  Pro Recco
2021–22:  Pro Recco

Titles by Club

See also
 Coppa Italia (women's water polo)

References

External links
 Italian Federation official website

Water polo competitions in Italy